Deputatsky is an urban locality (an urban-type settlement) and the administrative center of Ust-Yansky District in the Sakha Republic, Russia, located in the Selennyakh Range, about  north-northeast of Yakutsk, the capital of the republic. As of the 2010 Census, its population was 2,983.

Geography
Deputatsky is spread out along a  section of the Oyun-Unguokhtakh River, up to its mouth on the Irgichyan, which becomes a source of the Uyandina River.

History
It was founded in 1951 as a mining settlement, exploiting nearby deposits of tin. In its early years, its workforce included Gulag prisoners. In 1958, Deputatsky was granted urban-type settlement status. In 1967, it replaced the selo of Kazachye as the administrative center of Ust-Yansky District.

Due to the downturn in the mining industry following the dissolution of the Soviet Union, more than three-quarters of population left during the 1990s. However, mine production continued and the population decline slowed down.

Administrative and municipal status
Within the framework of administrative divisions, the urban-type settlement of Deputatsky serves as the administrative center of Ust-Yansky District. As an administrative division, it is incorporated within Ust-Yansky District as the Settlement of Deputatsky. As a municipal division, the Settlement of Deputatsky is incorporated within Deputatsky Municipal District as Deputatsky Urban Settlement.

Transportation
From there, a winter road (zimnik) leads through Batagay and the Verkhoyansk Range to Topolinoye, from where the Kolyma Highway is accessible.

An unmaintained winter road heads east from Deputatsky down the Uyandina Valley to Belaya Gora.

A small airport on the northern edge of the settlement (ICAO-Code UEWD) provides air service.

Climate
Deputatsky has an extreme subarctic climate (Köppen climate classification Dfc bordering on Dfd). Winters are prolonged and bitterly cold, with up to seven months of sub-zero high temperatures, so that the soil remains permanently frozen. Permafrost and tundra cover most of the region.

See also

References

Notes

Sources
Official website of the Sakha Republic. Registry of the Administrative-Territorial Divisions of the Sakha Republic. Ust-Yansky District. 

Urban-type settlements in the Sakha Republic